John Claudius Beresford  was an Anglican priest in Ireland, most notably Dean of Elphin and Ardagh from 1944  to 1954.

Beresford was educated at Trinity College, Dublin and ordained deacon in 1897 and priest in 1898. After a curacy in Drumgoon he held incumbencies in  Bailieborough and Kiltoraght.

References

19th-century Irish Anglican priests
20th-century Irish Anglican priests
Deans of Elphin and Ardagh
Alumni of Trinity College Dublin